The Naked Truth is the fourth live album by Dutch hard rock band Golden Earring, released in 1992. All songs were performed with acoustic instruments. The album has been released over the decade with additional tracks under the titles The Complete Naked Truth and Fully Naked.

Track listing
All songs written by Hay and Kooymans except where noted.

"Introduction" (Gerritsen, Hay, Kooymans, Zuiderwijk)
"Jangalene" (Kooymans)
"Another 45 Miles" (Kooymans)
"Mad Love's Comin'"
"Why Do I?"
"I Can't Sleep Without You"
"Weekend Love" (Gerritsen, Hay, Kooymans, Zuiderwijk)
"Vanilla Queen"
"Twilight Zone" (Kooymans)
"One Shot Away from Paradise" (Gerritsen)
"Long Blond Animal"
"Pouring My Heart Out Again"
"Radar Love"
"Eight Miles High" (Gene Clark, David Crosby, Roger McGuinn)
"The Naked Truth" (Hay, Kooymans, E.H. Roelfzema)

Other versions

The Complete Naked Truth
A 1998 edition of the album titled The Complete Naked Truth was sold as a two disc collection. Besides the above tracks, the collection included an additional seven tracks billed as previously unreleased.

"Back Home" (Kooymans, Hay)
"Just a Little Bit of Peace in My Heart" (Kooymans)
"Going to the Run" (Kooymans, Hay)
"Jangalene" (Alternate) (Kooymans)
"Don't Stop the Show" (Kooymans)
"When the Lady Smiles" (Kooymans, Hay)
"Radar Love" (Edit) (Kooymans, Hay)

Fully Naked
A three disc collection titled Fully Naked was released in 2001 as a box set. Besides including the two discs above, the set included a third disc again touted as previously unreleased.

"In a Bad Mood"
"As Long As the Wind Blows"
"Please Go/Sound of the Screaming Day"
"Murdock 9 6182"
"Yellow and Blue"
"Devil Made Me Do It"
"Madame Zou Zou"

Personnel
Rinus Gerritsen - acoustic guitar, upright bass
Barry Hay - flute, rhythm guitar, vocals
George Kooymans - guitar, vocals
Cesar Zuiderwijk - drums, percussion

Production
Producers: Golden Earring, John Sonneveld
Engineer: John Sonneveld
Design: Henk Schiffmacher
Photography: Reinoud Klazes, Patricia Steur

Charts

Weekly charts

Year-end charts

Certifications

References

Golden Earring live albums
1992 live albums